Aloeides oreas, the oreas copper, is a butterfly of the family Lycaenidae. It is found in South Africa, where it is known from the Eastern Cape to the KwaZulu-Natal Drakensberg, the Free State and mountain peaks in Mpumalanga near Wakkerstroom.

The wingspan is 21–24 mm for males and 22–26 mm females. Adults are on wing from September to December, with a peak in October and from January to April, with a peak in January. There are two generations per year.

References

Butterflies described in 1968
Aloeides
Endemic butterflies of South Africa